What It Is is the sixth album by guitarist Boogaloo Joe Jones which was recorded in 1971 and released on the Prestige label.

Reception

Allmusic awarded the album 3 stars stating "Jones has his cult following, but as soul-jazz goes, this is kind of run of the mill: good for background, but not captivating foreground listening".

Track listing 
All compositions by Joe Jones except where noted
 "Ain't No Sunshine" (Bill Withers) - 5:30  
 "I Feel the Earth Move" (Carole King) - 6:10  
 "Fadin'" - 7:00  
 "What It Is" - 7:00 
 "Let Them Talk" (Sonny Thompson) - 5:45  
 "Inside Job" - 6:15

Personnel 
Boogaloo Joe Jones - guitar
Grover Washington Jr. - tenor saxophone
Butch Cornell - organ
Jimmy Lewis - electric bass
Bernard Purdie - drums
Buddy Caldwell - congas, bongos

References 

Boogaloo Joe Jones albums
1971 albums
Prestige Records albums
Albums recorded at Van Gelder Studio
Albums produced by Bob Porter (record producer)